Jérémy Chardy and Marc Gicquel were the defending champions, having beaten Lukáš Dlouhý and Leander Paes in the 2010 final but decided not to participate this year.
Dlouhý and Paul Hanley won this tournament. Their opponents (Robert Lindstedt and Horia Tecău) retired, when the result was 6–4, due to Lindstedt's injury.

Seeds

Draw

Draw

References
Main Draw

Doubles
Brisbane International - Doubles